Zafra is a town situated in the Province of Badajoz (Extremadura, Spain), and the capital of the comarca of Zafra - Río Bodión.  It has a population of 16,677, according to the 2011 census.

Zafra is the hometown of  Fray Ruy Lopez, author of one of the first European treatises on chess, and the humanist and arbitrist Pedro de Valencia.

History
Human traces of great antiquity have been found in the area.  In the "El Castellar" mountains are located caves with pictograms.  Also, a fort dating to the Bronze Age was found in the nearby chapel of Belén.

Roman era
Zafra has been associated with the Roman names Restituta Iulia Imperial, Contributa Iulia Ugultunia, and Segida Restituta Iulia, though this applies equally to some of the other towns in the area. The name Contributa Julia appears on an 1849 map of Roman Hispania (in the south-west of Spain, in the area named Baeturia) alongside the name Regina (presently associated with the ruins of a small Roman town of the same name ), lending some geographical support to the possibility of an association of the name Contributa Iulia or Contributa Julia with Zafra. Other sources, however, support an association of the name Segida Restituta Iulia with Zafra. Yet other, authoritative, sources associate no Roman name with Zafra. In the area round Zafra may be found the remains of as many as 20 Roman villas. These, and associations between the name Restitutia Iulia and a migration from the legendary Segeda, may be linked to the origin of the town.

Under Moorish rule
A significant fact is that Zafra is located between Badajoz, and Seville, the capital of the province of Baetica.

In medieval times, Zafra was situated on the border which divided the domains of Seville and Badajoz, and in 1030 a defensive fortification was constructed in the Castellar Mountains.  This fort would be named Sajra Abi Hassan by the Moorish geographer Abu Abdullah al-Bakri in 1094.  The Arabs named the town Safra, or Cafra, meaning 'the yellow one', from which derived the current name.

The Reconquista
During the Reconquista, Zafra was captured twice by Christian forces, first in 1229 by Alfonso IX, and then definitively by Ferdinand III, in a campaign through present-day Extremadura described in Alfonso X's Crónica General de España (General History of Spain).

However, the most momentous change was the granting of the city by Henry III of Castile to Gomes Suárez de Figueroa, who until then had been a servant to the queen and son of the Grand Master of the Order of Santiago.  Gomes' son and second title-holder, Lorenzo Suárez de Figueroa, began  to make Zafra the center of the domain of Feria.  He started building a wall with the dual purpose of defense and control of neighbours, merchants, and travellers.  Its construction lasted from 1426 to 1449 (or 1442).  Also in 1437 he ordered the construction of one of the most emblematic buildings of the city, El Alcázar, which would be his residence.  Additionally, he funded the hospital of Santiago and finished the Convent of the Clares of Saint Mary of the Valley, which would be used as a mausoleum for his family.  In 1460, Henry IV of Castile raised the district to the status of a condado (county), and added the villages of Halconer y La Morena to Lorenzo's domain.

16th century onward
In the 16th and 17th centuries the city was modernized, an example of which was the conversion of the Alcázar into a palace of the Austrian style, and a new church was completed.  All this modernization was begun when the fifth count of Feria was raised to a duke and grandee in 1567, for his contributions to the state under Felipe II.

In the 17th century, the Dukedom of Feria was united with the Marqueship of Priego, and in the 18th century it was integrated with the Dukedom of Medinaceli.

Today
Zafra has always been an industrial and commercial city, serving surrounding areas mainly dedicated to agriculture.  A commercial base are the fairs that have been celebrated for Saint John since 1395 and for Saint Michael since 1453.

International relations

Festivals
Feria Internacional Ganadera ("International Rancher's Fair"), held in the last week of September and the first week of October.
De la luna al fuego, celebrated on the second to last week of June, coinciding with the festival of Saint John
Semana Santa ("Easter"), held according to the church's calendar.
The Carnival.  It includes the Festival of Fat, where a number of pig products are tasted in the plazas.
San Isidro, held at the end of the week closest to May 15.
Procession of our lady the Virgen of Belén, held on the Sunday following Resurrection Sunday.

Twin towns — sister cities

Zafra is twinned with:

References

Municipalities in the Province of Badajoz